Stade Municipal is a multi-use stadium in Lomé, Togo.  It is currently used mostly for football matches.

External links

Municipal